Phil Comeau (born 1956), CM is a Canadian film and television director, born in Saulnierville, Nova Scotia. He lives in Moncton, New Brunswick and Montreal, Quebec.

Biography 
Phil Comeau is a film and television director and scriptwriter, based in Moncton, New Brunswick and in Montreal, Quebec. His documentary and drama films have won over 570 awards at film festivals worldwide. He has directed films and TV episodes in Canada and in over 20 countries. His films have been translated in 27 languages, and been broadcast in 200 countries. A globetrotter, Phil has traveled on all continents and visited over 50 countries.

In drama, he directed and co-wrote the award-winning drama feature film Jerome's Secret in Canada, and two TV movies Crash of the Century in France, and Teen Knight in Romania and the USA. His popular drama series include Tribu.com (I & II) with viewer ratings in Quebec of 1.3 million, La Sagouine, Lassie, Emily of New Moon, Pit Pony, Les couleurs de mon accent, World Legends and the docu-drama series Mayday broadcast worldwide.

His recent award-winning feature documentaries include The Secret Order, Zachary Richard Cajun Heart, Acadian Music Wave, Secretariat's Jockey Ron Turcotte, and The Nature of Frederic Back. He also directed many documentary series.

Comeau has directed and wrote numerous films about his Acadian culture. Among them, the first independent Acadian drama feature film Jerome's Secret, the first Acadian comedy The Gossips, the first Acadian children's film The Hooked Rug of Grand-Pré, and a popular series remake on an iconic Acadian character La Sagouine. On the subject of the world Acadian diaspora, he had directed an Acadian feature in Louisiana Zachary Richard Cajun Heart, a series in Quebec Les Acadiens du Québec and documentaries in France Belle-Ile-en-Mer, a Breton and Acadian Island and Belle-Ile in Acadie.

As an author, he has also published poetry in two books Plumes d'ictte and Éloizes, a published film script Les Gossipeuses, an Acadian dictionary Le parler Acadjonne, and in 2014 was the editor and co-director of the anthology Acadie Then and Now, a 500-page collective containing both history and contemporary articles on the world diaspora Acadian, which won the international award Prix France-Acadie in Paris.

Phil Comeau is a member of the Academy of Canadian Cinema and Television, the Directors Guild of Canada (DGC), the Association des réalisateurs et réalisatrices du Quebec (ARRQ), and the Front des réalisateurs indépendants du Canada (FRIC).

Recognitions
His films and TV series have received over 570 awards at film festivals worldwide. Phil Comeau has received five (5) Orders: he has been appointed a member of the Order of Canada in 2011; the Order of New Brunswick and the Ordre de la Pléiade from the Assemblée des Parlementaires de la Francophonie in 2016; the distinction of the Ordre des francophones d'Amérique at the National Assembly in Quebec in 2007; and the rank of "Officer" of the Ordre des Arts et des Lettres in France in 2006. He also received two Honorary Doctorats in Arts from the Université de Moncton, N.B. (2013) and from Université Sainte-Anne in N.S. (2007); the Prix Meritas of the Federation acadienne du Quebec in 1999; the Grand-Pre Award from the Minister of Culture of Nova Scotia in 1997, and the Prix Champion in Ottawa in 1995. His feature film Zachary Richard, Cajun Heart was presented at the United Nations in Geneva in 2017.
In 2021, Comeau was awarded the Médaille Léger-Comeau, the highest Acadian distinction by the Société Nationale de l'Acadie.

The Secret Order (L'Ordre secret) won the "Prix coup de cœur du public" / "People's choice award" at the 2022 Festival international du cinéma francophone en Acadie.

Filmography

As director 

 2023: Roots, diaspora and war (Racines, diaspora et guerre)}}

As writer

Honors 
 2022: Officier - Ordre des Arts et Lettres (Paris, France) 
 2021: Médaille Léger-Comeau, the highest Acadian distinction awarded by the Société Nationale de l'Acadie 
 2020: Prix Louisiane-Acadie - 15th Cinema Festival on the Bayou (Lafayette, Louisiana)
 2019: Médaille de la Ville de Marennes -10th Festival of Francophone Culture (Marennes, France)
 2019: The Canadian Encyclopedia (Historica Canada), Inclusion on list of 30 Famous Francophones in Canada
 2018: Prix Eloize, Acadian Artist Most Illustrated Internationally (New Brunswick, Canada)
 2018: Prix du public Radio-Canada / People's Choice for Acadian Artist of the Year (New Brunswick, Canada)
 2018: Prix du President, Richelieu International (Canada)
 2017: The Canadian Encyclopedia (Historica Canada), Inclusion of biography (Canada) 
 2017: United Nations, Presentation of his film "Zachary Richard Cajun Heart" (Geneva, Switzerland) 
 2016: Cultural Personality of the Year, Acadie-Nouvelle (New Brunswick, Canada)
 2016: Order of New Brunswick, Gouvernment of New Brunswick (Canada) 
 2016: Order of La Pléiade, Assemblée Parlementaire de la Francophonie (OIF, International) 
 2015: Prix France-Acadie Award, Amitiés France-Acadie (Paris, France)
 2014: Personality of the week, Radio-Canada & Acadie-Nouvelle (Maritimes, Canada)
 2014: Prix Acadie-Québec Award, Bureau atlantique du Quebec & Société national de l'Acadie (New Brunswick, Canada) 
 2014: Certificat de mérite, Fédération acadienne de la Nouvelle-Écosse, Halifax (Nova Scotia, Canada) 
 2014: Film Retrospective Phil Comeau, 6 films (Lafayette, Louisiana)
 2013: Honorary Doctorat in Arts, Université de Moncton (New Brunswick, Canada) 
 2012: Queen Elizabeth II Diamond Jubilee Medal (Ottawa, Canada)
 2011: Order of Canada (Ottawa) 
 2007: Honorary Doctorat in Fine-Arts, Université Sainte-Anne (Nova Scotia, Canada) 
 2007: Ordre des francophones d'Amérique (Quebec, Canada) 
 2006: Chevalier - Ordre des Arts et Lettres (Paris, France) 
 1999: Prix Méritas Award, Federation acadienne du Québec (Montréal, Canada) 
 1997: Prix Grand-Pré Award, Halifax (Nova Scotia, Canada) 
 1995: Prix Champion, Fédération culturelle canadienne-française (Ottawa, Canada)

References

Phil Comeau at The Canadian Encyclopedia (engl. or french)
https://web.archive.org/web/20190524124714/http://www.omada.ca/artiste/phil-comeau-2
http://ici.radio-canada.ca/nouvelle/1009464/serie-grandes-entrevues-phil-comeau-le-parcours-dun-artiste-convaincu

External links 
 
 https://www.dgc.ca/en/quebec/memberView?m=1950

Acadian people
Canadian male screenwriters
Film producers from Quebec
Members of the Order of Canada
Film directors from Montreal
Writers from Montreal
Film directors from Nova Scotia
Writers from Nova Scotia
People from Digby County, Nova Scotia
Film directors from New Brunswick
Writers from Moncton
1956 births
Living people
Acadian film
Film producers from New Brunswick